Monsieur Sinfray, ( 1747–1757) or Monsieur de St. Frais, was a French artillery officer in the Battle of Plassey (1757), who fought for Siraj Ud Daulah, Nawab of Bengal. He was also the secretary to the Council at Chandernagore. Earlier, he succeeded D.E. Choisis as Chef de Yanaon in 1747.

See also
Colonial History of Yanam

Further reading
Hill, S.C. The Three Frenchmen in Bengal or The Commercial Ruin of the French Settlement in 1757, 1903

References

French generals
French India
18th-century French military personnel